A Shaggy defense is a legal defense strategy in which a person denies an accusation with the simple defense of "it wasn't me", despite overwhelming evidence to the contrary. The strategy's name is derived from reggae musician Shaggy's 2000 single "It Wasn't Me", which narrates a story of shamelessly denying one's infidelity; it was coined by Slate writer Josh Levin in 2008 to describe the defense tactics used by singer, songwriter, and producer R. Kelly while on trial for child pornography charges.

Origin

"It Wasn't Me" by reggae musician Shaggy was released in September 2000 as the first single from his fifth album Hot Shot, eventually reaching No. 1 on the Billboard Hot 100 and other countries. The lyrics of the song depict one man asking his friend what to do after his girlfriend catches him having sex with another woman. His friend's advice is to deny everything, despite clear evidence to the contrary, with the phrase "It wasn't me". As the narrator describes all the evidence his girlfriend has against him, from a video recording to witnessing the cheating herself, his friend adamantly repeats "it wasn't me". Ultimately, the narrator says that the advice "makes no sense at all".

On February 3, 2002, a video surfaced showing popular R&B musician R. Kelly statutorily raping, and urinating on, an underage girl. The story, which was released by an unknown source, was sent to the Chicago Sun-Times, the newspaper that broke the story on February 8, 2002. This news surfaced on the day Kelly was to perform at the opening ceremony of the 2002 Winter Olympics. In interviews with WMAQ television of Chicago and MTV News, Kelly said that he was not the man in the video. In June 2002, Kelly was indicted in Chicago on 21 counts of child pornography. That same month, Kelly was apprehended by the Miami Police Department on a Chicago arrest warrant. 

The case earned media attention, and Kelly's insistence that he was not the man in the video as his only line of defense earned mockery. As comedian Chris Rock commented on the case during his 2004 stand up special Never Scared, "What the fuck is wrong with R. Kelly? He's got a lot of balls, ok? Talkin' about 'it ain't me'. Got a damn sex tape out, 'it ain't me'. Motherfucker we know what you look like!" When the case went to trial in 2007, Kelly based his defense on denying that it was him in the video, which led Slate writer Josh Levin to coin the term the "Shaggy defense" in reference to the song to describe Kelly's strategy: "I predict that in the decades to come, law schools will teach this as the 'Shaggy defense'. You allege that I was caught on camera, butt naked, banging on the log cabin floor? It wasn't me." Levin repeated the term on NPR. Ultimately, Kelly was found not guilty on those charges.

According to Josh Levin of Slate, "As Kelly's lawyers mentioned multiple times, the alleged victim in this case—now a 23-year-old woman—told a grand jury that it wasn't her. While 15 friends and relatives testified that the girl in question was indeed on the video, neither the alleged victim nor her parents showed up in court to testify for either side." The prosecution witness Lisa Van Allen was easily impeached as a witness due to her clearly sordid history with R. Kelly, others, and even soliciting a bribe from an investigator in the case. One juror told the Chicago Tribune, "At some point we said there was a lack of evidence."

Use
Although the term remains most commonly associated with the R. Kelly trial, it has been subsequently used to describe any case where the defendant simply denies they are the individual who committed the crime in the face of overwhelming evidence. For example, in the 2010 Virginia court case Preston v. Morton, in which an allegation against a driver accused of striking a man with a tractor trailer while he was installing traffic lights was refuted by the defendant claiming that he was not the one driving the truck in question, U.S. District Judge Jackson Kiser specifically cited the alleged driver as using the Shaggy defense in his written judgement. Writing about the case, Josh Levin noted the endurance of the term he coined: "The Shaggy defense, like the jury system and the principle of habeas corpus, is one of the pillars underpinning American jurisprudence."

Additionally in 2010, Chris Hayes accused BP of using the Shaggy defense over their refusal to accept responsibility for the Deepwater Horizon oil spill.

In 2013, The Atlantic accused the United States Department of Justice of using the Shaggy defense in regards to their refusal to respond to a lawsuit filed against them by the American Civil Liberties Union over the CIA's use of unmanned drones in warfare by claiming that the program was a state secret, even though it had been acknowledged and even defended multiple times by the Obama administration.

In February 2019, Virginia governor Ralph Northam was accused of using the Shaggy defense after photographs from his medical school yearbook page surfaced showing a man in blackface next to a man wearing Ku Klux Klan robes. When the story first came out, Northam stated that he apologized for being in the image. However, a day later, Northam changed his story, claiming that it wasn't him. Multiple commentators, including CNN political analyst April Ryan and Michael Eric Dyson, cited the R&B song in their remarks on his conflicting explanations.

See also
 Actual innocence
 Chewbacca defense
 Idiot defense
 King Kong defense
 The Matrix defense
 Twinkie defense

References

External links
 Clip from The Tonight Show in which Shaggy discusses the origin of the song

Criminal defenses
Informal legal terminology
Legal terminology from popular culture
R. Kelly
Relevance fallacies
2008 neologisms